Michael Anastasio Murphy (30 September 1941 – 17 March 2019) was an English rugby union and professional rugby league footballer who played in the 1960s and 1970s.

Background
Murphy was born in Liverpool, Merseyside, England.

He worked as a physical education teacher, he taught at Howard Street College, Barrow-in-Furness, he worked as a television actor, and he appeared as the character 'Ged' in the television series Merseybeat episode 'Unhappy Medium' that aired on 29 July 2002

Playing career

International honours
Mick Murphy won caps for Wales (RL) while at Bradford Northern in the 1975 Rugby League World Cup against France, New Zealand, and France, in 1977 against France, and while at St. Jacques XIII, France in 1979 against France.

County honours
Mick Murphy won caps for Lancashire (RL) while at Barrow, and he appeared as the character 'Ged' in the television series Merseybeat in the episode named 'Unhappy Medium' that aired on 29 July 2002.

County Cup Final appearances
Mick Murphy played left-, i.e. number 11, in Leigh's 4-15 defeat by St. Helens in the 1963 Lancashire County Cup Final during the 1963–64 season at Knowsley Road, St. Helens on Saturday 26 October 1963.

BBC2 Floodlit Trophy Final appearances
Mick Murphy played right-, i.e. number 12, in Leigh's 5-8 defeat by Castleford in the 1967 BBC2 Floodlit Trophy Final during the 1967–68 season at Headingley Rugby Stadium, Leeds on Saturday 16 January 1968.

Club career
Mick Murphy made his début for St. Helens in the 2–13 defeat by Widnes at Naughton Park on Wednesday 13 September 1972.

References

External links
(archived by web.archive.org) Back on the Wembley trail
Photograph "Northern prepare to pack down" at rlhp.co.uk
Photograph "Stan looks to offload" at rlhp.co.uk
Photograph "A Roy Francis half time talk" at rlhp.co.uk
Photograph "Northern Pack '76" at rlhp.co.uk
Photograph "Mick Murphy At His Best" at rlhp.co.uk
Photograph "Francis Jarvis celebrates" at rlhp.co.uk
Profile at saints.org.uk
(archived by archive.is) Mighty Mick Murphy – A Barrow and St Helens powerhouse
Dual-code man Murphy handed key RU mission

1941 births
2019 deaths
Barrow Raiders players
Bradford Bulls players
English rugby league players
English rugby union players
Schoolteachers from Cumbria
English male television actors
Lancashire rugby league team players
Leigh Leopards captains
Leigh Leopards players
People educated at St Mary's College, Crosby
Rugby league players from Liverpool
Rugby league props
Rugby union players from Liverpool
St Helens R.F.C. players
St. Jacques XIII players
Tonneins XIII players
Wales national rugby league team players
Waterloo R.F.C. players